Miss Europe 1992 was the 47th edition of the Miss Europe pageant and the 36th edition under the Mondial Events Organization. It was held in Athens, Greece on June 15, 1992. Marina Tsintikidou of Greece, was crowned Miss Europe 1992 by out going titleholder Katerina Michalopoulou of Greece.

Results

Placements

Contestants 

 - Valbona Selimllari
 - Karin Friedl
 - Sandra Joine
 - Glina Velitchkova
 - Yiota Koufalidou (Giota Koufalidou)
 - Pavlína Babůrková
 - Joanne Elizabeth Lewis
 - Ekha Urbsalu
 - Kirsi-Mari Ketola (Kirsi-Maria Ketola)
 -  Linda Hardy
 - Meike Schwarz (Maike Schwartz)
 - Marina Tsintikidou
 - Mariëlle Pontier
 - Orsolya Anna Michna (Michna Orsolya)
 - Heiðrún Anna Björnsdóttir
 - Tara McDonald
 - Ravit Kanfi
 - Rosangela Bessi
 - Rasa Kukenytė
 - Carole Reding
 - Karin Demicoli
 - Rita Omvik
 - Jana Fabian
 - Maria Fernanda Silva
 - Liliana Les
 - Anna Portnaya
 - Katrina Lyall
 - Sofia Mazagatos
 - Jeannette Lindstroem (Jeannette Lindström)
 - Sandra Aegerter
 - Banu Sağnak
 - Sharon Isherwood

Notes

Withdrawals

Debuts

Debuts/Returns
 - Was represented in the pageant as Russia/USSR back in 1929 and the 1930s. This is the first time Russia is competing as its own country.

Returns

"Comité Officiel et International Miss Europe" Competition

From 1951 to 2002 there was a rival Miss Europe competition organized by the "Comité Officiel et International Miss Europe". This was founded in 1950 by Jean Raibaut in Paris, the headquarters later moved to Marseille. The winners wore different titles like Miss Europe, Miss Europa or Miss Europe International.

On September 27, 1992, an unofficial Miss Europe competition took place in Catania, Sicily, Italy. There were at least 12 entrants in the pageant. At the end, Yolanda Marcos Gonzales of Spain was crowned as Miss Europa 1992. succeeded predecessor Sandrina Rossi of France.

Placements

Contestants

 - Nathalie De Cuyper
 - Mette Friis-Mikkelsen
 - Emma Ashby
 - Anne Jandera
 - Caren Buffor
 - Elena Liafou
 - Wendy Niesthoven
 - Camilla Conolly Carew
 - Tatiana Zaghet
 - Nathalie Quiring
 - Susanna Silva
 - Yolanda Marcos Gonzales

References

External links 
 

Miss Europe
1992 beauty pageants
1992 in Greece
1992 in Italy